The Mainstream Top 40 airplay-based chart debuted in Billboard magazine in its issue dated October 3, 1992, with rankings determined by monitored airplay from data compiled by Broadcast Data Systems, a then-new technology which can detect when and how often songs are being played on radio stations. The 40-position chart was published in the print edition of Billboard through May 1995, after which it only appeared in Billboards sister publication, Airplay Monitor, and the Billboard.com website, returning to the print edition in 2003. During the 1990s, the chart was called Top 40/Mainstream alongside a second Top 40 Airplay chart, Top 40/Rhythm-Crossover. The first number-one song on both of these charts was "End of the Road" by Boyz II Men.

Mainstream Top 40 is compiled from airplay on radio stations which play a wide variety of music, not just "pure pop", which Billboard defines as "melodic, often synth-driven, uptempo fare". During the 1990s, mainstream top 40 went from R&B dominating the airwaves (and thus the charts) in the early 1990s to rock and alternative music becoming the choice of program directors in the latter part of the decade. The mid-1990s also witnessed a drastic difference between what reached the top of the Mainstream Top 40 chart and the Hot 100, when songs started being promoted to radio and receiving significant airplay without the release of a commercially available single, a requirement for a song to reach the Hot 100. Thus, number-one songs on the Mainstream Top 40 such as "I'll Be There for You", "Fly", "Don't Speak", "Lovefool", "Torn", "Uninvited", and "Iris" failed to reach or have a similar impact on the Hot 100. Hot 100 rules changed allowing airplay-only songs to chart in late 1998.

Number-one pop songs of the 1990s

See also
1990s in music
List of Billboard Hot 100 number-one singles of the 1990s
List of artists who reached number one on the Billboard Mainstream Top 40 chart

References

External links 
 Current Billboard Pop Songs chart, Billboard.com.
 Billboard Charts Legend, Billboard.com.

United States Mainstream Top 40
Lists of number-one songs in the United States
Billboard charts
1990s in American music